Handball is a popular team sport in Poland.

 Superliga
 Ekstraklasa
 Poland men's national handball team
 Poland women's national handball team

See also
 Sports in Poland

References